The Naperville Ribfest is an annual ribfest held at Knoch Park in Naperville, Illinois over the Fourth of July weekend. It is a fundraiser that involves food, live music and carnival rides. The first Naperville Ribfest was inaugurated in 1988. The 2022 ribfest will occur at the DuPage County Fairgrounds in Wheaton, Illinois.

References

External links
 Official website

Food and drink festivals in the United States